Inequity is injustice or unfairness or an instance of either of the two. Aversion is "a feeling of repugnance toward something with a desire to avoid or turn from it; a settled dislike; a tendency to extinguish a behavior or to avoid a thing or situation and especially a usually pleasurable one because it is or has been associated with a noxious stimulus". The given definition of inequity aversion is "the preference for fairness and resistance to inequitable outcomes".

Clarification through experiment

To better understand and breakdown the concept of social inequity aversion would be to use the study done by Sarah Brosnan and   Frans de Waal , who specialize in social behavior and social cognition. In their experiment, "Monkeys Reject Unequal Pay" five female capuchin monkeys were used and given an unequal distribution of rewards by the human experimenter. The female monkeys alternated in pairs under four different conditions with the experimenter. Of the female monkeys, two received the same reward, one female received a superior reward, one female received a superior reward without exchange (for example without work), and a single female observed a superior reward in the absence of a partner. The females were much less likely to complete a trade with the human experimenter when their corresponding partner received a food item of higher value item (a grape; the lower item was a cucumber), and when that partner received the higher food item with no exchange of work of any kind, the likelihood of not completing a trade intensified. All of these refusals of exchange included both passive and active rejections ranging from refusing to take the awards to throwing the reward, respectively. These negative responses of situation made with the monkeys support the early evolutionary origin of inequity aversion and thus helps (in combination with the definitions of inequity and aversion) give an overall idea of what social inequity aversion is: the tendency to reject or avoid situations in which there is social inequality, unfairness, or injustice.

In humans
It is important to note that the experiment was done with capuchin monkeys and not humans, and because humans are not the only cooperative animals (monkeys being one of many examples), we cannot assume that inequity aversion is an exclusive human trait or nature. There have been other experiments done with humans to test the validity of the inequity aversion theory proposed by Brosnan and de Waal. An experiment performed by Urs Fischbacher, Christina M. Fong, and Ernst Fehr called "Fairness, Errors, and the Power of Competition" consisted of a multi-lateral ultimatum game where one contestant was put up against multiple ones. In this experiment when the responders accepts the offer from the person giving the reward (say the 'provider'), the person giving the reward (the provider) gets his full pay. The key to this experiment is that the ability of one responder to affect the pay of the provider is lessened by all of the other responders' willingness to accept the reward. As a result, the concept of inequity aversion is followed, which says that the responders' willingness to reject the reward is lessened as well as the providers' offers. (This is because in order to evade inequality or injustice due to unequal pay, all of the participants reduce their amounts to reduce the chance of unfairness). What's most important to realize in this experiment is that the outcome does not seem to agree with those of Brosnan and de Waal's capuchin experiment; humans will not reject the offer unless it affects others reward and/or pay. So for humans, the original Fehr-Schmidt inequity aversion model, which was cited by Brosnan and de Waal in their capuchin experiment saying that the capuchin monkeys should always eat the lower value food, seems to hold validity. By not rejecting the reward offered, the humans decreased the amount of inequality. This was the opposite for the capuchins as they rejected the lower value food (cucumbers) when they couldn't get the higher value food (grapes) thus increasing the inequality, especially when the capuchins who received the grapes stole the discarded cucumbers, leaving the other monkeys with nothing. That increased the amount of inequality among the capuchins—The humans would only reject the reward if it reduced the reward of the individual who received the most.

Combining with social inequality
According to Sarah Brosnan, "human beings have a similar approach, we do not live in a world of absolute values but one in which we are constantly comparing ourselves with those about us and, like a capuchin, we can tell when we are being short changed". This can directly be connected to social inequality in that we as humans know what social inequality is and can identify it as an injustice; it is how we know that something such as unequal pay based on socioeconomic status is social inequality. However, according to the concept of social inequity aversion, we will not reject what is offered to us unless we realize that by rejecting what we are offered we will reduce another person's earnings or the earnings of the person who is giving to us, thus making our earnings closer to theirs, thus lessening the inequality.

One key example that links these two concepts could be that of the Neoclassical labor-market theory. Based on several important facts, this theory is based on the supposition that "(1) a relatively free and open market exists in which individuals compete for position. (2) Position in that markets depends heavily on the individual's efforts, abilities, experience, training, or 'human capital.' (3) There are automatic mechanisms that operate in the marketplace to ensure that imbalances between one's input (human capital) and one's rewards (wages) are corrected in a way to restore balance" (Hurst 231). This concept is interesting in that the third fact that is assumed to be true in a labor-market theory would apply greatly to the concept of social inequity aversion. This is because it would seem that in order to get the reward that is expected we as people will take what is given to us for our skill. But when it becomes possible that our fellow citizen can get more than us, or that the company that is providing us with the reward (payments) gets more money from our labor/skill, then we as people in this labor market theory will reject the payments, and try to obtain a better one. We do this by trying to attain better resources for ourselves, such as "education, training, skills, and intelligence" (Hurst 231). So take for example an African American woman, she will take the payment that all African American women are receiving. But once another African American woman begins to get better payment: via her better resources, other African American women will reject their current position as well as resources and seek more to in order to, maybe not directly lessen the payment that other African American woman, but to get more for themselves. This greatly illustrates the social inequity aversion concept when it comes to humans and how it crosses with the neoclassical labor market theory. However, because it is a continuous process in which different opportunities open up doors for individuals based on their life changes and access to better resources, an imbalance is made and a gap develops, thus separating individuals and creating ongoing social inequality (Hurst 231).

See also
 Spite house – homes built to annoy and aggravate someone, usually a neighbor, in response to a perceived inequitable situation.

References

Social systems
Distribution of wealth
Egalitarianism
Social inequality